Shawn Tompkins (March 16, 1974 – August 14, 2011) was a Canadian kickboxer and mixed martial artist, and later trainer. At the time of his death, he was an instructor at the Tapout Training Center. He formerly coached the Los Angeles Anacondas of the International Fight League.

Biography and career
Tompkins began studying Shotokan karate at the age of six, and went to be a two-time Canadian National Karate Champion and a third degree black belt in the discipline. He began kickboxing at sixteen years old and competed in 47 matches, holding Canadian, North American and South American titles.

At the age of eighteen, he opened his first training facility in Ontario, Canada. He later relocated to Las Vegas, Nevada in the United States in August 2007 and worked as the head striking coach at Xtreme Couture Mixed Martial Arts before joining the Tapout Training Center in October 2009. He was also the coach for the Los Angeles Anacondas of the International Fight League, officially taking the reins from Bas Rutten as the head coach on March 17, 2007, just before their matchup against the San Jose Razorclaws.

Tompkins taught such notable fighters as Vitor Belfort, Mark Hominick, Chris Horodecki, Wanderlei Silva and Sam Stout.

On November 30, 2011, at the Pearl at the Palms Casino Resort in Las Vegas during the 2011 World MMA Awards Results, Tompkins was posthumously awarded the Lifetime Achievement Award.

Personal life
Tompkins was married to Emilie Stout, the sister of fellow fighter, Sam Stout.  On Sunday, August 14, 2011, Tompkins died unexpectedly, of a sudden heart attack, in his sleep at the age of 37.

Gym history
The gym's predecessor Team Tompkins MMA System was founded in 2001 by MMA trainer Shawn Tompkins coach of the Los Angeles Anacondas of the International Fight League. During his time as head coach he trained the future of Adrenaline's talent as well as being involved with Xtreme Couture Mixed Martial Arts and the Tapout Training Center in Las Vegas, Nevada. The gym saw great success during this time with Team Tompkins holding two belts in TKO/UCC at Lightweight and Featherweight, with a combined total of 11 title defenses between Mark Hominick(7) and Sam Stout(4). During this period Chris Horodecki made it to the finals of the IFL World Grand Prix to challenge for the IFL Lightweight title. "The Coach" corned Mark Hominick in the gyms first UFC title challenge against Jose Aldo at UFC 129 on April 30, 2011, for the inaugural UFC Featherweight Championship. Tompkins tragically passed away on August 14, 2011. He remains as an influential figure and an inspiration to members of the gym. From December 6, 2011, onward members of the gym were consistently involved in a Toronto based Anti-bullying campaign.

Adrenaline MMA Training & Fitness
The gym in its current form emerged in 2012, founded by three of Tompkins star pupils Mark Hominick, Sam Stout and Chris Horodecki. Who went about training the next generation of mixed martial artist's out of the newly rebranded Adrenaline MMA Training & Fitness. During this period Adrenaline-talent Chad Laprise embarked on an 7 fight win-streak to earn himself a spot on the UFC's reality TV show The Ultimate Fighter. He would go on to win the season's Tournament and received bonus awards for Fight of the Season and Performance of the Season. In 2013 Jesse Ronson won the Aggression FC Lightweight Championship, Malcolm Gordon won the HFC Flyweight Championship in 2014, They also moved locations to a new training center. The facility expands over two floors and 11,000 square feet. In 2015 Chris Horodecki challenged Lance Palmer for the World Series of Fighting Featherweight Championship and the gym would begin offering female only jujitsu lessons which became popular. In 2016 Malcolm Gordon won the WXC Flyweight Championship and defended it once. 2017-2018 saw the gym hold 3 Championships in TKO Major League MMA with Jesse Ronson winning both the TKO Lightweight and Welterweight Championships, Malcolm Gordon won the TKO Flyweight Championship defending it twice. Both Ronson and Gordan were invited to join the UFC in 2020.

Mixed martial arts record

|-
| Loss
|align=center| 0–4
| Joel Leblanc
| TKO (punches)
| UCC 6 - Redemption  	
| 
|align=center| 1
|align=center| 2:38
| Montreal, Quebec, Canada
|
|-
| Loss
|align=center| 0–3
| David Loiseau
| TKO (punches)
| UCC 4 - Return Of The Super Strikers
| 
|align=center| 1
|align=center| 1:26
| Sherbrooke, Quebec, Canada
|
|-
| Loss
|align=center| 0–2
| Steve Vigneault	
| TKO (punches)
| UCC 2 - The Moment of Truth
| 
|align=center| 1
|align=center| 2:43
|Montreal, Quebec, Canada
|
|-
| Loss
|align=center| 0–1
| Matt Rocca
| TKO (punches)
| UCC 1 - The New Beginning
| 
|align=center| 1
|align=center| 8:50
| Montreal, Quebec, Canada
|

References

External links

1974 births
2011 deaths
Canadian male kickboxers
Canadian male mixed martial artists
Middleweight mixed martial artists
Mixed martial artists utilizing Shotokan
Mixed martial artists utilizing Muay Thai
Canadian male karateka
Canadian Muay Thai practitioners
Kickboxing trainers
Mixed martial arts trainers
Sportspeople from Tillsonburg